Marie of Württemberg (1818-1888) was daughter of the Duke of Württemberg and Landgravine of Hesse-Philippsthal in her own right.

Life 
Marie was born in Bad Carlsruhe (current-day Pokój, Poland) the daughter of  Duke Eugen of Württemberg and Princess Mathilde of Waldeck and Pyrmont. 

She married the Landgrave Karl of Hesse-Philippsthal (1803-1868) on the 9th of October, 1845. They had two children, Ernst (1846–1925) and Karl Alexander (1853–1916). 

In the beginning of the 1880s, Marie founded the "Vaterländischen Frauenverein" or Women's Association of the Fatherland in Philippsthal, a group focused on nursing and social assistance. 

She died at the Schloss Philippsthal and is buried in the Philippsthal cemetery.

References 

1818 births
1888 deaths
Landgraves of Hesse